The 2022–23 All-Ireland Junior Club Hurling Championship was the 19th staging of the All-Ireland Junior Club Hurling Championship, the Gaelic Athletic Association's junior inter-county club hurling tournament. The championship ran from 29 October 2022 to 14 January 2023.

The All-Ireland final was played on 14 January 2023 at Croke Park in Dublin, between Ballygiblin from Cork and Easkey from Sligo, in what was their first ever meeting in the final. Ballygiblin won the match by 1-16 to 0-11 to claim their first ever championship title.

Easkey's Andy Kilcullen was the championship's top scorer with 4-32.

Team summaries

Connacht Junior Club Hurling Championship

Connacht semi-final

Connacht final

Leinster Junior Club Hurling Championship

Leinster first round

Leinster quarter-finals

Leinster semi-finals

Leinster final

Munster Junior Club Hurling Championship

Munster quarter-finals

Munster semi-finals

Munster final

Ulster Junior Club Hurling Championship

Ulster quarter-finals

Ulster semi-finals

Ulster final

All-Britain Junior Club Hurling Championship

Britain semi-finals

Britain final

All-Ireland Junior Club Hurling Championship

All-Ireland quarter-finals

All-Ireland semi-finals

All-Ireland final

Championship statistics

Top scorers

Overall

In a single game

Miscellaneous

 Shane Beston's score of 3-03 against St. Kieran's is the highest individual score ever recorded by a player in a Munster final.
 Ballygiblin became the first team to win consecutive Munster Championship titles.

References

All-Ireland Junior Club Hurling Championship
All-Ireland Junior Club Hurling Championship
2017